The 1997 NCAA basketball tournament was the 73rd season in the Philippine National Collegiate Athletic Association (NCAA). The season opened on August 2 at the Araneta Coliseum and ended on October 6 with the San Sebastian Stags winning their fifth straight championship in the Seniors division.

This was the first-ever final four semifinals.

Seniors' tournament

Elimination round

Bracket

Stepladder semifinals
Both rounds are straight knockout matches.

First round 

Letran Knights beat Mapua Cardinals, 68–57, on October 1, in the first of two knockout matches to determine defending champion San Sebastian College's finals opponent. The Stags completed a 12-game elimination round sweep to automatically clinch the first finals slot.

Second round 
San Beda Red Lions finished second and drew a bye; they defeated Letran Knights two nights later, 72–65, and arranged a title clash with San Sebastian Stags.

Finals
San Sebastian has the twice-to-beat advantage over San Beda, who only has to lose once to lose the series.

Game 1

Stags' Rommel Adducul capped another MVP season with 20 points and 16 rebounds while Jasper Ocampo and Ulysses Tanique sparked the Stags' breakaway 25–7 run in the final 15 minutes. San Sebastian won their fifth consecutive title and the school's ninth NCAA crown.

References

73
1997 in Philippine basketball